Alfaiate is a surname. Notable people with the surname include:

Alexandre Alfaiate (born 1995), Portuguese footballer
Rúben Alfaiate (born 1995), Portuguese footballer